The Economic and Social Research Council (ESRC), formerly the Social Science Research Council (SSRC), is part of UK Research and Innovation (UKRI). UKRI is a non-departmental public body (NDPB) funded by the UK government. ESRC provides funding and support for research and training in the social sciences. It is the UK's largest organisation for funding research on economic and social issues.

History
The ESRC was founded in 1965 as the Social Science Research Council (SSRC - not to be confused with the Social Science Research Council in the United States). The establishment of a state funding body for the social sciences in the United Kingdom, had been under discussion since the Second World War; however, it was not until the 1964 election of Prime Minister Harold Wilson that the political climate for the creation of the SSRC became sufficiently favourable.

The first chief executive of the SSRC was Michael Young (later Baron Young of Dartington). Subsequent holders of the post have included Michael Posner, later Secretary General of the European Science Foundation.

Change of name
Following the election of Prime Minister Margaret Thatcher in the 1979 general election, the Government expressed reservations about the value of research in the social sciences, and the extent to which it should be publicly funded. In 1981, the Education Secretary Sir Keith Joseph asked Lord Rothschild to lead a review into the future of the SSRC.

It was ultimately decided (due in no small part to the efforts of Michael Posner, chief executive of the SSRC at the time) that the Council should remain, but that its remit should be expanded beyond the social sciences, to include more 'empirical' research and research of 'more public concern'. To reflect this, in 1983 the SSRC was renamed the Economic and Social Research Council.

Mission
The ESRC's mission, according to its website, is to:

 promote and support, by any means, high-quality research and related postgraduate training on social and economic issues
 develop and support the national data infrastructure that underpins high-quality research
 advance knowledge and provide trained social scientists who meet the needs of users and beneficiaries, thereby contributing to the economic competitiveness of the UK, the effectiveness of public services and policy, and the quality of life
 communicate clearly and promote public understanding of social science.

Description
The ESRC is based at Polaris House in Swindon, which is also the location of the head offices of several other councils of UK Research and Innovation: AHRC, BBSRC, EPSRC, Innovate UK, MRC, NERC and STFC, as well as the UK Space Agency. At any one time ESRC supports over 4,000 researchers and postgraduate students in academic institutions and independent research institutes.

Notable people
Chairman:
 1965 to 1968: Michael Young
 1979 to 1983: Michael Posner

Chief Executive:
 2010 to 2014: Paul Boyle
 2014 to 2017: Jane Elliott

Executive Chair:
 2017 to 2020: Jennifer Rubin

Legacy of slavery projects
The ESRC funded two projects at the Centre for the Study of the Legacies of British Slave-ownership: from 2009 to 2012, the Legacies of British Slave-ownership project, and from 2013 to 2015 the Structure and significance of British Caribbean slave-ownership 1763-1833 project (co-funded by the Arts and Humanities Research Council). This work built the publicly available Legacies of British Slave-ownership database.

References

External links
 ESRC website
 UK Research and Innovation
 ESRC YouTube channel

Education in the United Kingdom
Research councils
Government agencies established in 1965
Organisations based in Swindon
Economic research institutes
Department for Business, Energy and Industrial Strategy
Non-departmental public bodies of the United Kingdom government
1965 establishments in the United Kingdom
Social research
Members of the International Science Council